Chamyna is a genus of moths of the family Erebidae. The genus was erected by Jacob Hübner in 1821.

Lepidoptera and Some Other Life Forms also gives Varia as a species group of Calliteara Butler, 1881.

Species
Chamyna homalogramma Hampson, 1926
Chamyna homichlodes Hübner, 1806
Chamyna lamponia H. Druce, 1890
Chamyna modesta Schaus, 1912

References

Calpinae
Noctuoidea genera